Jean-Claude Borelly  is a French trumpeter and composer.

Background
At the age of seven he developed a passion for the trumpet after discovering Louis Armstrong on television. He met a prominent trumpeter of the Paris Opera who, touched by his fascination for the trumpet, introduced him to the instrument and accompanies all during his studies at the Conservatory and has the Normal School of Music.

Early years
At the age of fourteen he had trumpet lessons at the school of music in Paris. When he was eighteen, Borelly wanted to share his passion so he started teaching the trumpet to the beginners at the school of music.

During the 1970s, Borelly became fanatical about rhythm and blues. He was so fond of it that he did not hesitate to give up his classical studies and start playing in bands.

Dolannes Melodie
1975 was a turning point in Borelly's life. The recording of "Dolannes Melodie" (title theme of the film Un linceul n'a pas de poches) was about to change his future. This record quickly went to first place in the charts of most European countries, first in France, Switzerland, Belgium and then Germany, Austria, and the Netherlands; outside of Europe, it also topped the charts in Mexico and later in Japan. It sold over one million copies, and was awarded a gold disc.

With "Dolannes Melodie", Borelly managed to introduce his own modern trumpet style.  Together with Paul de Senneville and Olivier Toussaint (his composers/producers), he has developed a melodious and romantic style of music.

Recent years
In 1995, he decided to move to Las Vegas. He gave several concerts. In 2000, he returned to France and, three years later, he composed and recorded The Sound of Lac d'Amour.

Since June 2006, his touring focuses on concerts in churches and cathedrals accompanied by his musicians and singers.

Discography
 Concerto de la mer
 Dolannes Melodie
 Les 24 merveilles du monde la trompette (Vol 1)
 Les 24 merveilles du monde la trompette (Vol 2)
 Meilleur de Jean-Claude Borelly
 De Las Vegas a Paris
 La melodie du lac d'amour
 Love follow us (Richard Clayderman with Delphine Artists)
 Love follow us 2 (Richard Clayderman with Delphine Artists)
 Friends France (Richard Clayderman with Delphine Artists)
 D'Or de Rêve et de Lumière

See also
List of trumpeters
Richard Clayderman

References

External links
 Borelly biography
 Official Delphine website featuring Jean-Claude Borelly
 Jean-Claude Borelly in mtv.com
 
 

French trumpeters
Male trumpeters
French composers
French male composers
Pop trumpeters
1953 births
Living people
Musicians from Paris
21st-century trumpeters
21st-century French male musicians